The Roman Catholic Archdiocese of Mbeya is an archdiocese located in Mbeya in Tanzania.

History
 July 18, 1932: Established as Mission “sui iuris” of Tukuyu from the Apostolic Vicariate of Tanganyika
 March 29, 1938: Promoted as Apostolic Prefecture of Tukuyu 
 July 14, 1949: Promoted as Apostolic Vicariate of Mbeya
 March 25, 1953: Promoted as Diocese of Mbeya (in the Ecclesiastical province of Songea)
 December 21, 2018: Promoted as Archdiocese of Mbeya

Leadership
 Ecclesiastical Superior of Tukuyu (Roman rite) 
 Fr. Max Theodor Franz Donders, M. Afr. (1932.11.11 – 1938)
 Prefects Apostolic of Tukuyu (Roman rite) 
 Fr. Ludovico Haag, M. Afr. (1938.04.08 – 1947)
 Fr. Anthony van Oorschoot, M. Afr. (1947 – 1949.07.14 see below)
 Vicars Apostolic of Mbeya (Roman rite) 
 Bishop Anthony van Oorschoot, M. Afr. (see above 1949.07.14 – 1953.03.25 see below)
 Bishops of Mbeya (Roman rite)
 Bishop Anthony van Oorschoot, M. Afr. (see above 1953.03.25 – 1964.12.10)
 Bishop James Dominic Sangu (1966.05.03 – 1996.11.28)
 Bishop Evaristo Marc Chengula, I.M.C. (1996.11.08 - 2018.11.21)
 Archbishops of Mbeya
 Archbishop Gervas John Mwasikwabhila Nyaisonga (since 2018.12.21)

Suffragan Dioceses 

Diocese of Iringa
Diocese of Sumbawanga

See also
Roman Catholicism in Tanzania

Sources
 GCatholic.org
 Catholic Hierarchy

Mbeya
Christian organizations established in 1932
Mbeya
Roman Catholic dioceses and prelatures established in the 20th century
 
 
Mbeya